Elvis González may refer to:

 Elvis González (footballer) (born 1982), Colombian footballer
 Elvis González Valencia (born 1980), suspected Mexican drug lord